"Nothin' to Lose" is a song by American hard rock band Kiss, released on their self-titled debut album in 1974. It is the first single the band had ever released and the first single off the album, with "Love Theme from KISS" as the B-side. Although the song failed to chart, it has remained a concert staple during the 1970s and was featured on many live albums and compilations.

Background
Gene Simmons, the sole writer of the song, admitted that the song's lyrics chronicled the singer coercing his girlfriend into trying anal sex, and her subsequent enjoyment of it. Gene Simmons, Paul Stanley, and Peter Criss share the lead vocals on the song.

The song was the first Kiss song to feature an extra player, as Bruce Foster played piano on the track. His contribution was noted on the sleeve of the album. "Nothin' to Lose" was one of the first songs Kiss performed on their first national appearances, on ABC's In Concert on February 19 (the show aired on March 29). Other songs performed on the show were "Firehouse" and "Black Diamond".

Reception
Cash Box said that "one of the finest, new heavy metal bands to come out of New York City in some time debuts here (with Kerner-Wise at the controls) with a very heavy, very tasty rocker reminiscent of Deep Purple, yet able to stand freely alone on its own merits." Record World called it a "hard rocker par excellence" with "big gutsy vocals and heavy instrumentals."

Live performances
"Nothin' to Lose" was played often during the 1970s, but largely ignored during the 1980s. In the 1990s, the band performed the song at the Kiss Convention (one time with Peter Criss) and MTV Unplugged, and during the Psycho Circus show in Los Angeles.

Appearances
"Nothin' to Lose" has appeared on the following Kiss albums:
Kiss - studio version
Alive! - live version
The Originals - studio version
Kiss Unplugged - live version
The Box Set - studio version and the Unplugged version
Gold - studio version
Kiss Chronicles: 3 Classic Albums - studio version
Kiss Alive! 1975–2000 - Alive! version
Kiss Alive 35 - live version

Other appearances:
B-side of the "Kissin' Time" single
B-side of the "Shout It Out Loud" live single

Track listing
A-side - "Nothin' to Lose"
B-side - "Love Theme from KISS"

Personnel
Kiss
Gene Simmons – bass, lead vocals
Peter Criss – drums, lead vocals
Paul Stanley – rhythm guitar, lead vocals
Ace Frehley – lead guitar, backing vocals

Additional personnel
 Bruce Foster – acoustic piano, additional guitar

References

Kiss (band) songs
1974 debut singles
Songs written by Gene Simmons
1974 songs
Casablanca Records singles
Warner Records singles
Anal eroticism